Tell Rayak is an archaeological site 1 km northeast of Rayak in the Beqaa Mohafazat (Governorate). It dates at least to the Neolithic.

References

Baalbek District
Neolithic settlements
Archaeological sites in Lebanon
Great Rift Valley